{{chembox
| Verifiedfields = changed
| Watchedfields = changed
| verifiedrevid = 413150531
| ImageFile = Tephrosin.png
| ImageSize = 200px
| IUPACName = 7a-Hydroxy-9,10-dimethoxy-3,3-dimethyl-13,13a-dihydro-3H,7aH-pyrano[2,3-c;6,5-f]dichromen-7-one
| OtherNames = 12aβ-hydroxydeguelin
|Section1=
|Section2=
|Section3=
|Section8=
}}Tephrosin''' is rotenoid. It is a natural fish poison found in the leaves and seeds of Tephrosia purpurea and T. vogelii''.

See also
Cubé resin

References

Pesticides
Phenol ethers
Acyloins
Tertiary alcohols
Rotenoids
Cyclic ethers
Heterocyclic compounds with 5 rings
Pyranochromenes
Methoxy compounds